Shaun Gallagher is an American philosopher known for his work on embodied cognition, social cognition, agency and the philosophy of psychopathology. Since 2011 he has held the Lillian and Morrie Moss Chair of Excellence in Philosophy at the University of Memphis and was awarded the Anneliese Maier Research Award by the Humboldt Foundation (2012–2018). Since 2014 he has been Professorial Fellow at the University of Wollongong in Australia. He has held visiting positions at Keble College, Oxford; Humboldt University, Berlin; Ruhr Universität, Bochum; Husserl Archives, ENS (Paris); École Normale Supérieure, Lyon; University of Copenhagen; and the Cognition and Brain Sciences Unit, Cambridge University. He is also known for his philosophical notes on the effects of solitary confinement.

Career
Gallagher received his PhD in philosophy from Bryn Mawr College where he studied with George Kline and José Ferrater-Mora. He also studied philosophy at Villanova University and Leuven, and economics at the State University of New York–Buffalo.

Gallagher is the author of several books, including Action and Interaction (2020),Enactivist Interventions: Rethinking the Mind (2017), How the Body Shapes the Mind (2005), Phenomenology (2012), Hermeneutics and Education (1992), The Inordinance of Time (1998), Brainstorming (2008), The Phenomenological Mind (2008; 2nd edition, 2012, 3rd edition 2021) (with Dan Zahavi), and (with several co-authors) The Neurophenomenology of Awe and Wonder (2015). He is also editor of The Oxford Handbook of the Self (2011), co-editor of The Oxford Handbook of 4E-Cognition (2018),  and editor or co-editor of several other volumes. He is a founding editor and currently the co-editor in-chief of the journal Phenomenology and the Cognitive Sciences,

Bibliography

 Performance/Art: The Venetian Lectures  (Milan: Mimesis Mimesis International Edizioni, 2021) 
 Action and Interaction  (Oxford: Oxford University Press, 2020) 
 Oxford Handbook of 4E-Cognition (ed. with A. Newen, L. DeBruin (Oxford: Oxford University Press, 2018) 
 Enactivist Interventions: Rethinking the Mind  (Oxford: Oxford University Press, 2017) 
 Phenomenology  (London: Palgrave Macmillan, 2012) 
 The Oxford Handbook of the Self (ed) (Oxford University Press, 2011)
 Handbook of Phenomenology and Cognitive Science. Co-edited with D. Schmicking (Berlin: Springer, 2010)
 The Phenomenological Mind (Routledge; 2008). Second edition (2012); Third edition (2021), co-authored with Dan Zahavi.  Translations: Hungarian (2008); Italian (2009); Danish (2010); Japanese (2011); Korean (2013); Spanish (2013); Polish (2015); Arabic (2016).
 Brainstorming: Views and Interviews on the Mind (Exeter, UK: Imprint Academic, 2008)
 Does Consciousness Cause Behavior?  An Investigation of the Nature of Volition. Co-edited with W. Banks and  S. Pockett (Cambridge, MA: MIT Press, 2006)
 How the Body Shapes the Mind (Oxford University Press; 2005) 
 Ipseity and Alterity: Interdisciplinary Approaches to Intersubjectivity. Co-edited with S. Watson (Rouen: Publications de l'Université de Rouen, 2004) 
 Models of the Self. Co-edited with J. Shear (Exeter, UK: Imprint Academic, 1999)
 The Inordinance of Time (Northwestern University Press, 1998) 
 Hegel, History, and Interpretation. Editor (Albany: State University of New York Press, 1997)
 Merleau-Ponty, Hermeneutics, and Postmodernism. Co-edited with T. Busch. (Albany: State University of New York Press, 1992)
 Hermeneutics and Education (State University of New York Press; 1992); Chinese translation (2009)

See also
 American philosophy
 Phenomenology (philosophy)
 Philosophy of mind
 Cognitive science
 Hermeneutics
 List of American philosophers

References

External links
 Faculty webpage
 Publications
 Google Scholar
 Reviews and Info: How the Body Shapes the Mind
 Notre Dame Philosophical Reviews: Review of How the Body Shapes the Mind

21st-century American philosophers
American consciousness researchers and theorists
Bryn Mawr College alumni
Hermeneutists
Phenomenologists
Philosophers of mind
Academics of the University of Hertfordshire
University of Memphis faculty
Living people
1948 births